Mark Alan Stuart (born April 14, 1968) is an American missionary and former Christian rock musician, singer and songwriter best known as the lead vocalist for the Christian rock band Audio Adrenaline during their original run from 1986 to 2007. Mark has won 2 Grammy Awards and has been nominated for 6.

Audio Adrenaline

Mark Stuart met the original guitarist and bassist for Audio Adrenaline, Barry Blair and Will McGinniss, while attending Kentucky Christian College (now known as Kentucky Christian University). Barry Blair was Mark's roommate for three years. They founded the band in 1986 under the name of A-180. However, they temporarily disbanded the next year when Mark went to Haiti for a semester. When he returned to Kentucky, the band reformed and recruited Bob Herdman, who brought them two songs to record. After they did, they changed their name to Audio Adrenaline and signed a deal with Forefront Records. After more than twenty years of success with the band and eight studio albums, Stuart decided to retire in January 2006. The primary reason cited was Stuart's "ongoing vocal challenges" stemming from vocal cord damage caused by a disorder known as spasmodic dysphonia.

After Audio Adrenaline

Stuart and Will McGinniss of Audio Adrenaline started a project called Know Hope Collective. The project features a changing group of musicians that sing worship songs and present testimonies.

Personal life

Stuart married Kerri McKeehan, sister of TobyMac, in 1995. The two later divorced. He and his second wife, Aegis, have two adopted children.

Missionary work

Stuart has visited Haiti consistently to help with missionary efforts. Stuart and McGinniss started the Hands and Feet Project, a nonprofit charity that funds orphanages in Haiti, in 2003.

On January 12, 2010, Stuart, his parents, and his wife Aegis were working at the Hands and Feet Project in Jacmel, Haiti when the earthquake struck Port-au-Prince.  None at the Project were injured by the quake, and Stuart was interviewed by media outlets such as CNN, MSNBC and BBC, among others. He assisted with relief efforts in Jacmel until returning to the U.S. on January 22, when he continued to assist by raising funds through continued coordination of relief efforts and organization of benefit concerts.

Contributions to other artists

 Stuart was producer for two-time Grammy Nominated and now Platinum-selling artists singer/songwriter Jennifer Knapp's hit album Kansas, and co-produced her first Grammy nominated album Lay It Down with Knapp.
 In the rock opera !Hero (in 2003) Stuart starred as Petrov, a character based on the apostle Peter. He starred alongside such notables as Michael Tait, T-Bone and Rebecca St. James.
 Stuart has written songs for tobyMac and Kutless, and co-wrote the song 'All the Above' by MercyMe from their 2002 album, Spoken For.
 Stuart has Executive Producer credit on the albums: The Healing of Harms by Fireflight; A Love Hate Masquerade by Kids in the Way; The Twenty-First Time by Monk & Neagle; Conquering the Fear of Flight by Wavorly; Where Do We Go from Here and Fireproof by Pillar; and Bone-Appetit! by T-Bone, among others
 Stuart is featured on the tracks: "Lord" from the compilation album Your Name (2008); "Sing Your Praises" from the T-Bone album Bone-Appetit! (2007); "The Lords Prayer" and "To You Be the Glory" from the compilation album Let's Roll: Together In Unity, Faith, and Hope (2002); and "Air" from the compilation album, Soul Lift (2001).
 Stuart contributes background vocals to the track "Trust in Me" on the album Katy Hudson (2001)

References

External links
 Mark Stuart on Twitter
 Hands & Feet Project
 Know Hope Collective Project

Living people
People from Owensboro, Kentucky
Rock musicians from Kentucky
1968 births
American performers of Christian music
Audio Adrenaline members
Singers from Kentucky
Songwriters from Kentucky
Performers of Christian rock music